Ahlia University (AU) is a private, not-for-profit university in Manama, Bahrain and owned by a private holding company, The Arab Academy for Research and Studies (AARS). The holding company is collectively owned by a group of companies and individuals from the Gulf Cooperation Council.

The AU project became a reality when the Government of Bahrain issued the Cabinet Decision No. 03-1626 dated March 2001, making it the first private university to be licensed by the government.

AU was conceived by its founders to be an agent of change in university education to ensure that students have a fulfilling learning experience that not only equips them for the world of work, but to become well-rounded, responsible citizens. AU cherishes its commitment to excellent quality in the core functions of teaching and learning, research and community engagement and through to all aspects of its operations.

Since its beginnings in 2001, the university has seen growth in its diverse student body; currently standing with an enrollment of more than 1,375. AU has a distinguished and diverse faculty with a high percentage of PhD holders and a robust publication record.

Ahlia University has five colleges:
 College of Arts and Science
 College of Business and Finance
 College of Engineering
 College of Information Technology
 College of Medical and Health Sciences

The university includes a deanship of student affairs and a deanship of graduate studies and research, in addition to a number of centres.

In 2021, Ahila University partnered with Huawei to establish both the Huawei ICT Academy, as well as a research organization focusing on the Internet of things.

References

External links 

 

Universities in Bahrain
Educational institutions established in 2001
2001 establishments in Bahrain
University of Wisconsin–River Falls